John Charles Herries PC (November 1778 – 24 April 1855), known as J. C. Herries, was a British politician and financier and a frequent member of Tory and Conservative cabinets in the early to mid-19th century.

Background and education
Herries was the eldest son of Charles Herries, a London merchant, by his wife Mary Ann Johnson, and was educated at Cheam and the University of Leipzig.

Political career
Herries worked his way up in the Treasury and eventually became Secretary to the First Lord of the Treasury, Commissary-General to the Army, Paymaster of the Civil List, Secretary to the Treasury (1823–1827), Chancellor of the Exchequer in Lord Goderich's government (1827–1828), Master of the Mint under the Duke of Wellington (1828–1830), briefly President of the Board of Trade (1830), Secretary at War under Sir Robert Peel (1834–1835), and finally President of the Board of Control in Lord Derby's first government (1852). During his tenure as Commissary-General, he used the help of Nathan Mayer Rothschild to transfer money to British and allied army troops on the continent, which was not an easy task during the Continental Blockade. Rothschild's successful conclusion of these transfers was one of the foundations of the house's English banking empire.

Herries was one of few men of ministerial experience to side with the protectionist Tories after the repeal of the Corn Laws. Following the death of Lord George Bentinck in 1848, Herries was suggested by Lord Stanley as an alternative to Benjamin Disraeli as Shadow Leader of the House of Commons. In the end Herries declined, and Disraeli gradually came into his own as leader. Staunchly protectionist, Herries was in repeated conflict with Disraeli who, despite championing protectionism barely six years before, was hurriedly disassociating himself and the party from that doctrine. The two never got along, and Herries' refusal to assist in the framing of the 1852 Budget (which he regarded as "wild work"), cannot have helped matters. By the time of Derby's second government in 1858, Herries had died. His son, Charles Herries, was appointed Chairman of the Board of Inland Revenue by Disraeli during the latter's second premiership in 1877.

Family
Herries married Sarah, daughter of John Dorington, in 1814. They had three sons, one of whom, Sir Charles Herries, was a well-known financier. Sarah died in February 1821. Herries survived her by over thirty years and died at St Julians, near Sevenoaks, Kent, in April 1855, aged 76.

References

The New Monthly Magazine (Vol. 22, 1828)

External links 
 

1778 births
1855 deaths
Chancellors of the Exchequer of the United Kingdom
Conservative Party (UK) MPs for English constituencies
Leaders of the Conservative Party (UK)
Masters of the Mint
Members of the Privy Council of the United Kingdom
Tory MPs (pre-1834)
UK MPs 1820–1826
UK MPs 1826–1830
UK MPs 1830–1831
UK MPs 1831–1832
UK MPs 1832–1835
UK MPs 1835–1837
UK MPs 1837–1841
UK MPs 1847–1852
UK MPs 1852–1857
Leipzig University alumni
British Army Commissariat officers
Presidents of the Board of Trade
Presidents of the Board of Control